Secret Fruit is a 2017 Chinese coming-of-age romance film directed by Lien Yi-chi and starring Chen Feiyu and Nana Ou-Yang. It is based upon the novel of the same name by Rao Xueman, who also wrote the film's screenplay. The film was released in China on July 7, 2017.

Plot
The seventeen-year-old Duan Bowen (Chen Feiyu) lost his mother at a young age and dislikes his step mother. One day, he notices Li Er (Mi Mi), a new teacher at his school. Although Li Er has a disability in her left ear, she helps her students succeed. Duan Bowen falls in love with this young, kindhearted woman but keeps it a secret. He follows her and they meet several times on rainy days. Li Er is willing to listen to his troubles, and she invites him to her house. She tells Duan Bowen to talk about his difficulties in her left ear. As he leaves her house, he meets her fiance, a man named Zhang Yang (Oho Ou). 

Little does he know that his childhood playmate Yu Chizi (Ouyang Nana) has a crush on him. Yu Chizi also knows about his crush on Li Er. During the second year of high school, Yu Chizi finds out that her best friend Si Jiali (Zou Yuanqing) also had an encounter with Duan Bowen and finds out Si Jiali's secret. Yu Chizi takes a picture of Si Jiali and Duan Bowen hugging at a bar and posts the picture on the school talkpage. Si Jiali is reprimanded and expelled from school. To make Duan Bowen jealous, Yu Chizi kisses her friend Hengdao (Zhang Chenghang), who has a crush on her. Duan Bowen is nonplussed and confronts Yu Chizi about the picture. Yu Chizi puts on an innocent facade, and he forgives her.

Cast
Chen Feiyu as Duan Bowen
Mi Mi as Li Er
Ouyang Nana as Yu Chizi
Zou Yuanqing as Si Jiali
Zhang Chenghang as Hengdao
Oho Ou as Zhang Yang
Yong Mei as Mother Yu
Zhang Yao as Dong Jialei

See also
The Left Ear (2015)

References

External links
Secret Fruit on Douban

2017 films
Chinese coming-of-age films
Chinese romance films
Beijing Enlight Pictures films
Chinese teen films
2010s coming-of-age films
Films based on Chinese novels
Films directed by Lien Yi-chi